João de Sousa Carvalho (22 February 1745c. 1798) was the foremost Portuguese composer of his generation.

Born in Estremoz, he studied music from 1753 at the Colégio dos Santos Reis in Vila Viçosa, then from 1761 at the Conservatório di Sant' Onofrio a Porta Capuana in Naples. In 1766 his setting of Metastasio’s operatic libretto La Nitteti was performed in Rome. The following year, he joined the Irmandade de Santa  Cecília at Lisbon and was appointed professor of counterpoint in the Seminário da Patriarcal, where he later served as mestre (1769–1773) and mestre de capela (1773–1798). In 1778, he became music teacher to the royal family. He died in Alentejo.

His numerous church works are written in a style similar to that of Niccolò Jommelli and, sometimes, Haydn. Several of his opere serie and serenatas were performed at the royal palaces of Ajuda and Queluz. Some of his keyboard music survives and is occasionally played today.

Some compositions

L’amore industrioso, 1769 (revived 1943, 1967)
Eumene (dramma serio per musica), 1773
L’Angelica (serenata), 1778
Perseo (serenata), 1779
Testoride argonauta (dramma), 1780 (revived 1987)
Seleuco, re di Siria (dramma), 1781
Everardo II, re di Lituania (dramma), 1782
Penelope nella partenza da Sparta (dramma per musica), 1782
L’Endimione (dramma per musica), 1783
Tomiri (dramma per musica), 1783
Adrasto, re degli Argivi (dramma per musica), 1784
Nettuno ed Egle (favola pastorale), 1785
Alcione (dramma per musica), 1787
Numa Pompilio II, re dei romani (serenata), 1789
 Fiat Misericordia - cooperative transcription of the score from the manuscript in the Wiki-score platform.
Masses, 1769, 1789, 1792

Bibliography
Luiz, Carlos Santos (1999), João de Sousa Carvalho: Catálogo Comentado das Obras, Fundação Calouste Gulbenkian.
Manuel Carlos de Brito: Opera in Portugal in the Eighteenth Century (Cambridge, 1989)
Robert Stevenson/Manuel Carlos de Brito: Carvalho, João de Sousa, Grove Music Online ed. L. Macy (Accessed [2007-05-05), http://www.grovemusic.com

1745 births
1798 deaths
People from Estremoz
18th-century classical composers
18th-century male musicians
18th-century musicians
Portuguese Classical-period composers
Portuguese classical composers
Music educators
18th-century Portuguese people
Portuguese opera composers
Portuguese male classical composers